Letha is an unincorporated community in Gem County, Idaho The community is located  west of Emmett. The Payette River flows northeast of Letha.

History 
Letha was founded by W.W. Wilton and a Colonel Barnard and named for Wilton's daughter, Letha Wilton. It was built approximately midway along the railway running from Emmett to New Plymouth, Idaho, with anticipation that it would become a major rail center; although this never occurred, Letha today remains a service center for the adjacent farms and ranches.

Letha's population was estimated at 100 in 1960.

Utilities and services 
The community includes a fire department, religious facilities, and manufacturing facilities. Higher education, police, medical and legal services are found at nearby Emmett.

Notable people
Pro-Life, farmer and perennial candidate in Idaho politics

References

Boise metropolitan area
Unincorporated communities in Gem County, Idaho
Unincorporated communities in Idaho